was a Japanese botanist.

Biography
Miyoshi was born in 1861 in the village of Iwamura, now part of modern-day Ena. He was born in a samurai family from the former province of Mino. A graduate of the Imperial University of Tokyo in 1889, he continued his scientific training at the University of Leipzig under the direction of German botanist Wilhelm Friedrich Philipp Pfeffer. In 1895, he earned his Doctorate of Science degree and returned to Japan as Professor of Botany at the University of Tokyo.

He entered the Imperial Academy of Japan in 1920.

Throughout his academic career, he studied the genera Prunus and Iris. At the beginning of 20th century, he promoted the idea of ‘natural monuments’ for preservation, a concept he brought back with him from his period of study in Germany.

Awards
1917: Order of the Sacred Treasure, 2nd class.

Selected publications
 15 sets.

References

External links

20th-century Japanese botanists
Botanists active in Japan
1861 births
1939 deaths
People from Gifu Prefecture
University of Tokyo alumni
Leipzig University alumni
Academic staff of the University of Tokyo
Recipients of the Order of the Sacred Treasure, 2nd class
21st-century Japanese botanists